The Lexington Bridge was a seven-span truss bridge on Route 13 over the Missouri River at Lexington, Missouri, between Ray County, Missouri, and Lafayette County, Missouri. It was designed by the Kansas City Bridge Company and opened on October 31, 1924. It was closed upon the opening of the new Ike Skelton Bridge on June 25, 2005, and was demolished the next month.

See also
List of bridges documented by the Historic American Engineering Record in Missouri
List of crossings of the Missouri River

References
Bridgehunter.com profile

External links

Buildings and structures in Ray County, Missouri
Buildings and structures in Lafayette County, Missouri
Bridges completed in 1924
Demolished bridges in the United States
Historic American Engineering Record in Missouri
Road bridges in Missouri